Coleiidae is a family of fossil decapod crustaceans, containing the following genera:
Coleia Broderip, 1835
Hasaracancer Jux, 1971
Hellerocaris Van Straelen, 1924
Proeryon Beurlen, 1928
Pseudocoleia Garassino & Teruzzi, 1993
Tropifer Gould, 1857
Willemoesiocaris Van Straelen, 1924

References

Polychelida
Decapod families
Prehistoric arthropod families